Kodihalli  is a village in the southern state of Karnataka, India. It is located in the Kanakapura taluk of Ramanagara district in Karnataka.

Demographics
As of 2001 India census, Kodihalli had a population of 5895 with 3050 males and 2845 females.

See also
 Bangalore Rural
 Districts of Karnataka

Notes

External links
 http://ramanagar.nic.in/

Villages in Ramanagara district